The Indiana Attorney General is the chief legal officer of the State of Indiana in the United States.  Attorneys General are chosen by a statewide general election to serve for a four-year term.  The forty-fourth and  Attorney General is Todd Rokita.

List of Indiana Attorneys General

Territorial

State
Under the 1816 Constitution of Indiana the office of Attorney General was filled by appointment. After the adoption of the 1851 constitution, the office was filled by popular election.
Parties

Notes

External links
 Indiana Attorney General official website
  National Association of Attorneys General - Curtis T. Hill

 
1816 establishments in Indiana